The Reformed Church is a historic Reformed church at 405 N. Main Street in Herkimer, Herkimer County, New York.  It was built in 1835 and is a two-story, painted brick structure with a stone rear wing.  It features a staged spire in the Federal style, with a clock in the base of the spire.

It was listed on the National Register of Historic Places in 1972.

References

External links

Reformed Church in America churches in New York (state)
Churches on the National Register of Historic Places in New York (state)
Historic American Buildings Survey in New York (state)
Federal architecture in New York (state)
Churches completed in 1835
19th-century Reformed Church in America church buildings
Churches in Herkimer County, New York
National Register of Historic Places in Herkimer County, New York